AX7 or AX-7 may refer to:

 Aeolus AX7, a 2014–present Chinese compact SUV
 Roland AX-7, a keytar